Jiří Hochmann (born 10 January 1986) is a Czech former professional racing cyclist. He rode at the 2015 UCI Track Cycling World Championships.

Major results

Track

2003
 UEC European Junior Championships
3rd  Points race
3rd  Team sprint
2008
 UEC European Under-23 Championships
3rd  Points race
3rd  Scratch
2009
 3rd  Madison (with Martin Bláha), UCI World Championships
2010
 1st  Madison (with Martin Bláha), UEC European Championships
2011
 2nd  Madison (with Martin Bláha), UCI World Championships
 3rd Six Days of Fiorenzuola (with Martin Bláha)
2012
 1st  Madison (with Martin Bláha), UEC European Championships
 3rd Six Days of Fiorenzuola (with Vojtěch Hačecký)
2016
 3rd  Elimination race, UEC European Championships

Road

2010
 5th GP Hydraulika Mikolasek
2011
 1st Stage 1 Szlakiem Grodów Piastowskich
2012
 1st Overall Okolo Jižních Čech
1st Stage 1
 4th Road race, National Road Championships
2013
 1st Stage 1 Tour of China I
 Tour of Fuzhou
1st Points classification
1st Stage 3
 3rd Tour of Nanjing
 7th Overall Tour of Taihu Lake
2014
 2nd GP Polski Via Odra, Visegrad 4 Bicycle Race
2015
 3rd GP Slovakia, Visegrad 4 Bicycle Race

References

External links
 

1986 births
Living people
Czech male cyclists
Sportspeople from Brno